Film Classics was an American film distributor active between 1943 and 1951. Established by Irvin Shapiro, the company initially concentrated on re-releases of earlier hits by other studios, but began to handle new independent productions of a generally low-budget nature.

In 1950, a proposed merger with another distributor Eagle-Lion Films fell through.

Filmography

 I Was a Criminal (1945)
 A Boy, a Girl and a Dog (1946)
 The Spirit of West Point (1947)
 For You I Die (1947)
 Women in the Night (1948)
 Devil's Cargo (1948)
 Blonde Ice (1948)
 The Argyle Secrets (1948)
 Unknown Island (1948)
 Money Madness (1948)
 Sofia (1948)
 Miraculous Journey (1948)
 Inner Sanctum (1948)
 Appointment with Murder (1948)
 Alaska Patrol (1949)
 The Judge (1949)
 State Department: File 649 (1949)
 Daughter of the West (1949)
 The Lovable Cheat (1949)
 Amazon Quest (1949)
 C-Man (1949)
 Not Wanted (1949)
 Search for Danger (1949)
 Lost Boundaries (1949)
 The Pirates of Capri (1949)
 The Flying Saucer (1950)
 Guilty Bystander (1950)
 Cry Murder (1950)
 The Vicious Years (1950)
 Swiss Tour (1950)

References

Bibliography
 Slide, Anthony. The New Historical Dictionary of the American Film Industry. Routledge, 2014.

Film distributors of the United States